Zhao Yide (born February 19, 1965) is a Chinese politician and the current Party Secretary of Shaanxi, and was previously the Governor of Shaanxi. Earlier in his career, he served as the Party Secretary of Hangzhou, and the Secretary-General of the Zhejiang Party Committee.

Biography
Zhao was born in Wenling, Zhejiang. He joined the Communist Party in January 1985. He has a bachelor's degree from the Central Party School in economic management, and a graduate degree from the Zhejiang Party School in philosophy. 

Zhao served as the head of the Communist Youth League in Zhejiang from December 2003 until November 2006. He then served as Deputy Party Secretary of Wenzhou from April 30, 2008 until September 28, 2011, while serving concurrently as the secretary of the Political and Legal Affairs Commission of Wenzhou, beginning in March of 2007. On September 28, 2011 Zhao was named Secretary of the Quzhou Municipal Committee, serving in this position for just under a year. In May of 2012, he was named Secretary-General of the Zhejiang Party Committee, and in June was made a member of the Provincial Party Standing Committee, ascending to sub-provincial ranks at the age of 47, becoming the youngest member of the provincial governing council at the time. He served as Party Secretary of Hangzhou from September 25, 2015 until March 26, 2018.

On March 26, 2018, Zhao was named Deputy Party Secretary of Hebei province.

On August 2, 2020, Zhao was named the acting governor of Shaanxi. He was elected as the governor on August 25, and served until December 1, 2022, when the Shaanxi Provincial People's Congress accepted his resignation.

On November 27, 2022, Zhao was inaugurated as Secretary of the Shaanxi Provincial Committee.

References

Living people
1965 births
Chinese Communist Party politicians from Zhejiang
People's Republic of China politicians from Zhejiang
Political office-holders in Zhejiang
Politicians from Taizhou, Zhejiang
Governors of Shaanxi
Central Party School of the Chinese Communist Party alumni
Deputy Communist Party secretaries of Shaanxi